The 43rd Annual Tony Awards, which honor achievement in the Broadway theatre was held on June 4, 1989, at the Lunt-Fontanne Theatre and broadcast by CBS television. The host was Angela Lansbury, making her fifth appearance as host, more than any other individual.

There were no nominations for Best Book of a Musical or for Best Score of a Musical.

The ceremony
Presenters and Performers: Barry Bostwick, Betty Buckley, Zoe Caldwell, Nell Carter, Carol Channing, Colleen Dewhurst, Jerry Herman, James Earl Jones, Larry Kert, Swoosie Kurtz, John Lithgow, Steve Martin, Richard Thomas, Tommy Tune, Leslie Uggams, Gwen Verdon, August Wilson, BD Wong.

Musicals and Plays represented: 
 Black and Blue ("Tain't Nobody's Bizness If I Do"/"That Rhythm Man" - Company)
 Jerome Robbins' Broadway ("Dance at the Gym" from West Side Story - Company)
 Starmites ("Starmites"/"Hard to Be Diva" - Company)
 The Heidi Chronicles (Scene with Joan Allen and Peter Friedman)
 Largely New York (with Bill Irwin and ensemble)
 Lend Me a Tenor (Scene with Philip Bosco and Victor Garber)
 Shirley Valentine (Scene with Pauline Collins)

Special Salute:
 "The Eleven O'Clock Number"/"Everything's Coming up Roses" from Gypsy (with Angela Lansbury)
 "Send in the Clowns" from A Little Night Music
 "Memory" from Cats (with Betty Buckley)
 "Being Alive" from Company (with Larry Kert)

Winners and nominees
Winners are in bold

Regional Theatre Tony Award
Hartford Stage Company, Hartford, Connecticut

Multiple nominations and awards

These productions had multiple nominations:

10 nominations: Black and Blue and Jerome Robbins' Broadway 
7 nominations: Lend Me a Tenor 
6 nominations: The Heidi Chronicles and Starmites
5 nominations: Largely New York and Our Town 
3 nominations: Legs Diamond 
2 nominations: Cafe Crown, Metamorphosis, Shirley Valentine and Welcome to the Club  

The following productions received multiple awards.

6 wins: Jerome Robbins' Broadway 
3 wins: Black and Blue 
2 wins: The Heidi Chronicles and Lend Me a Tenor

See also
 Drama Desk Awards
 Obie Award
 New York Drama Critics' Circle
 Theatre World Award
 Lucille Lortel Awards

External links
Tony Awards official site

Tony Awards ceremonies
June 1989 events in the United States
1989 theatre awards
Tony
1989 in New York City